Z-series trains are a train service offered by China National Railway. Z stands for Zhida Tekuai ("non-stop express"). Most Z-series trains do not have any intermediary stops, not even technical stops for changing locomotives or drivers. However, some of these trains later had a few stops added to their schedule to boost the number of passengers.

The majority have both soft sleepers and hard sleepers, while some Z trains have only soft sleepers, few of them also have soft seat. Most of the Z-series trains stop at either Beijing, Beijing West and Shanghai railway station or Shanghai South.

List of Z-series trains (as of August 28, 2015)

Z1: Beijing West-Changsha
Z2: Changsha-Beijing West
Z3:  Beijing West - Chongqing North
Z4: Chongqing North - Beijing West
Z5: Beijing West - Nanning
Z6: Nanning - Beijing West
Z7: Beijing - Qingdao North
Z8: Qingdao North - Beijing
Z9: Beijing - Hangzhou
Z10: Hangzhou - Beijing
Z14/11: Guangzhou East - Shenyang North
Z12/13: Shenyang North - Guangzhou East
Z15: Beijing - Harbin
Z16: Harbin - Beijing
Z17: Beijing - Harbin
Z18: Harbin - Beijing
Z19: Beijing West - Xi'an
Z20: Xi'an - Beijing West
Z21: Beijing West - Lhasa
Z22: Lhasa - Beijing West
Z23: Wuchang - Shenzhen
Z24: Shenzhen - Wuchang
Z25/28: Wuchang - Shanghai South
Z27/26: Shanghai South - Wuchang
Z29: Beijing - Yangzhou
Z30: Yangzhou - Beijing
Z31/34: Wuchang - Ningbo
Z32/33: Ningbo - Wuchang
Z35: Beijing West - Guangzhou
Z36: Guangzhou - Beijing West
Z37: Beijing West - Wuchang
Z38: Wuchang - Beijing West
Z42/39: Ürümqi - Shanghai
Z40/41: Shanghai - Ürümqi
Z43: Beijing West - Xi'an
Z44: Xi'an - Beijing West
Z45/48: Wuchang - Hangzhou
Z46/47: Hangzhou - Wuchang
Z49: Beijing West - Chengdu
Z50: Chengdu - Beijing West
Z51: Beijing - Nantong
Z52: Nantong - Beijing
Z53: Beijing West - Kunming
Z54: Kunming - Beijing West
Z55: Beijing West - Lanzhou
Z56: Lanzhou - Beijing West
Z59: Beijing West - Fuzhou
Z60: Fuzhou - Beijing West
Z61: Beijing - Changchun
Z62: Changchun - Beijing
Z63: Beijing - Changchun
Z64: Changchun - Beijing
Z65: Beijing West - Nanchang
Z66: Nanchang - Beijing West
Z67: Beijing West - Nanchang
Z68: Nanchang - Beijing West
Z69: Beijing West - Ürümqi
Z70: Ürümqi - Beijing West
Z71: Beijing - Sanming North
Z72: Sanming North - Beijing
Z75: Beijing West - Lanzhou
Z76: Lanzhou - Beijing West
Z77: Beijing West - Guiyang
Z78: Guiyang - Beijing West
Z79/82: Beijing - Dalian
Z80/81: Dalian - Beijing
Z88/85: Xi'an - Hangzhou
Z86/87: Hangzhou - Xi'an
Z89: Shijiazhuang - Guangzhou
Z90: Guangzhou - Shijiazhuang
Z94/91: Xi'an - Shanghai
Z92/93: Shanghai - Xi'an
Z95: Beijing West - Chongqing North
Z96: Chongqing North - Beijing West
Z97: Beijing West - Hung Hom
Z98: Hung Hom - Beijing West
Z99: Shanghai - Hung Hom
Z100: Hung Hom - Shanghai
Z104/101: Xiamen - Changchun
Z102/103: Changchun - Xiamen
Z105: Ji'nan - Ürümqi
Z106: Ürümqi - Ji'nan
Z107: Beijing West - Shenzhen
Z108: Shenzhen - Beijing West
Z114/111: Harbin - Haikou
Z112/113: Haikou - Harbin
Z117: Beijing - Jilin
Z118: Jilin - Beijing
Z121/124: Chengdu - Guangzhou
Z122/123: Guangzhou - Chengdu
Z128/125: Lanzhou - Xiamen
Z126/127: Xiamen - Lanzhou
Z133: Beijing West - Jinggangshan
Z134: Jinggangshan - Beijing West
Z138/135: Guangzhou - Ürümqi
Z136/137: Ürümqi  - Guangzhou
Z139: Beijing - Nantong
Z140: Nantong - Beijing
Z148/145: Shenzhen East - Zhengzhou
Z146/147: Zhengzhou - Shenzhen East
Z149: Beijing West - Guiyang
Z150: Guiyang - Beijing West
Z151: Beijing West - Xining
Z152: Xining - Beijing West
Z158/155: Harbin - Taizhou
Z157/156: Taizhou - Harbin
Z161: Beijing West - Kunming
Z162: Kunming - Beijing West
Z166/163: Lhasa - Shanghai
Z164/165: Shanghai - Lhasa
Z170/167: Qingdao - Guangzhou East
Z168/169: Guangzhou East - Qingdao
Z174/171: Harbin - Shanghai
Z172/173: Shanghai - Harbin
Z178/175: Harbin - Hangzhou
Z176/177: Hangzhou - Harbin
Z179: Beijing - Ürümqi
Z180: Ürümqi - Beijing
Z184/181: Baotou - Shenzhen East
Z182/183: Shenzhen East - Baotou
Z188/185: Shenyang North - Shenzhen
Z186/187: Shenzhen - Shenyang North
Z189: Zhengzhou - Guangzhou
Z190: Guangzhou - Zhengzhou
Z194/191: Shenyang North - Taiyuan
Z192/193: Taiyuan - Shenyang North
Z198/195: Taiyuan - Shanghai
Z196/197: Shanghai - Taiyuan
Z201: Beijing West - Sanya
Z202: Sanya - Beijing West
Z203: Beijing - Harbin
Z204: Harbin - Beijing
Z208/205: Changsha - Tianjin
Z206/207: Tianjin - Changsha
Z211/214: Guangzhou - Kunming
Z212/213: Kunming - Guangzhou
Z218/215: Lanzhou - Shanghai
Z216/217: Shanghai - Lanzhou
Z222/223: Chongqing North - Lhasa
Z224/221: Lhasa - Chongqing North
Z225/228: Beijing - Hefei
Z227/226: Hefei - Beijing
Z238/235: Harbin - Guangzhou East
Z236/237: Guangzhou East - Harbin
Z245/248: Changsha - Shanghai South
Z247/246: Shanghai South - Changsha
Z254/251: Xi'an - Shanghai
Z252/253: Shanghai - Xi'an
Z266/263: Lhasa - Guangzhou
Z264/265: Guangzhou - Lhasa
Z267/270: Hohhot East - Shanghai
Z268/269: Shanghai - Hohhot East
Z274/271: Xining - Qingdao
Z272/273: Qingdao - Xining
Z275/278: Yinchuan - Beijing West
Z277/276: Beijing West - Yinchuan
Z284/281: Baotou - Hangzhou
Z282/283: Hangzhou - Baotou
Z285: Beijing West - Nanning
Z286: Nanning - Beijing West
Z288/289: Kunming - Ningbo
Z290/287: Ningbo - Kunming
Z298/295: Baotou - Xiamen
Z296/297: Xiamen - Baotou
Z315: Beijing West - Hohhot
Z316: Hohhot - Beijing West
Z317: Beijing - Baotou
Z318: Baotou - Beijing
Z319: Datong - Baotou
Z320: Baotou - Datong
Z324/321: Lhasa - Chengdu
Z322/323: Chengdu - Lhasa
Z338/335: Baotou - Nanning
Z336/337: Nanning - Baotou
Z386/383: Sanya - Changchun
Z384/385: Changchun - Sanya
Z621: Beijing West - Shenyang North
Z622: Shenyang North - Beijing West
Z721: Beijing West - Changchun
Z722: Changchun - Beijing West
Z917: Lanzhou - Lhasa
Z918: Lhasa - Lanzhou

Passenger rail transport in China